Aissam Barroudi (born 10 May 1978) is a Moroccan footballer. He competed in the men's tournament at the 2000 Summer Olympics.

References

1978 births
Living people
Moroccan footballers
Morocco international footballers
Olympic footballers of Morocco
Footballers at the 2000 Summer Olympics
Place of birth missing (living people)
Association football goalkeepers